A by-election was held for the New South Wales Legislative Assembly electorate of Northumberland Boroughs on 6 November 1857 because of the death of Bob Nichols.

Dates

Candidates
 James Dickson was a partner in a large and successful business, which commenced as a general store at Maitland, but also had large lease holdings in New England.
 Captain Bourn Russell, chairman of the Hunter River New Steam Navigation Company, had been elected a member for Northumberland Boroughs at the 1856 election however his election was overturned by the Committee of Elections and Qualifications on a re-count.

Result

Bob Nichols died.

See also
Electoral results for the district of Northumberland Boroughs
List of New South Wales state by-elections

References

1857 elections in Australia
New South Wales state by-elections
1850s in New South Wales